Fernando Gomes (born 10 June 1954) is a Brazilian sports shooter. He competed in the mixed 25 metre rapid fire pistol event at the 1980 Summer Olympics.

References

1954 births
Living people
Brazilian male sport shooters
Olympic shooters of Brazil
Shooters at the 1980 Summer Olympics
Sportspeople from Rio de Janeiro (city)